Alpha Delta Pi, commonly known as ADPi (pronounced "ay-dee-pye"), is an International Panhellenic sorority founded on May 15, 1851, at Wesleyan College in Macon, Georgia. It is the oldest secret society for women. 

Alpha Delta Pi is a member of the National Panhellenic Conference, which is the governing council of its 26 member sororities. The sorority's national philanthropic partner is the Ronald McDonald House Charities. Its Executive Office is located in Atlanta, Georgia.

History 
Alpha Delta Pi was first founded as the Adelphean Society on May 15, 1851, at Wesleyan Female College in Macon, Georgia. The six founders included Eugenia Tucker Fitzgerald, Elizabeth Williams Mitchell, Sophronia Woodruff Dews, Octavia Andrew Rush, Mary Evans Glass, and Ella Pierce Turner.

In 1904, a committee of three, led by Jewel Davis, contacted Attorney Dupont Guerry, the college's president, about to the procedure to become a national organization. They secured a charter of incorporation from the state of Georgia. In 1905, the Adelphean Society changed its name to Alpha Delta Phi. At the time of nationalization, Alpha Delta Phi had 60 active members and 3,000 alumnae.

In 1905, Beta chapter was established at Salem College in Winston-Salem, North Carolina, by two members of Alpha chapter. The chapter had seven members and fifteen new initiates until the administration abolished sororities three years later. In 1906, the Gamma chapter was founded at Mary Baldwin Seminary. Visitors were not allowed at the school, so the chapter charter and special instructions were delivered to the new group by mail. In 1906, Jewel Davis entered the University of Texas at Austin as a graduate student, organized a group, and installed them as Delta chapter, the fourth chapter of Alpha Delta Phi. Jewel Davis is listed as a charter member as there was no precedent for affiliation. Today, the Delta chapter at The University of Texas at Austin is the oldest surviving chapter of Alpha Delta Pi. Between 1906 and 1912, eight more chapters were founded at various universities.

In 1913, Alpha Delta Phi officially changed its name to Alpha Delta Pi. The deliberations over this change remain largely unknown aside from the impetus of the discovery of a pre-existing men's fraternity using those exact letters and which pre-dated the original Adelphean Society's inception by almost 20 years. There seems to be little to no speculation as to why "Pi" was specifically chosen as a replacement letter, and or why it took so long to hear of the pre-existing ADPhi Fraternity. Thus in 1913 the Adelphean Society, through Convention legislation, changed the name of the organization, adopted a recognition pin, and appointed a standardization committee. The trustees at Wesleyan Female College voted to abolish sororities, leading to the closure of Alpha chapter in 1915. Chi chapter, at Wittenberg University, was the first chapter to bear the new name. In 1948, Mrs. Carolee Strock Stanard retired as Grand President and part of her keynote address became The Creed of Alpha Delta Pi. In 1960, Alpha Delta Pi's 100th chapter, Delta Omicron, was installed at East Carolina University. 

In 1979, Alpha Delta Pi adopted Ronald McDonald Houses as the National Philanthropy. In 1983, Alpha Delta Pi Foundation was established. In 2001, Alpha Delta Pi celebrated its 150th Anniversary in Atlanta, Georgia, and in 2006, the Delta chapter, the oldest open chapter of ADPi, celebrated its 100th anniversary at The University of Texas at Austin. In 2009, Theta Theta chapter at Quinnipiac University was installed. Theta Theta was the 200th chapter of ADPi to be installed. Chapters continue to be installed and anniversaries celebrated at numerous university campuses.

Symbols 
The open motto of ADPi is "We Live for Each Other," and its colors are azure blue and white. To the sorority, blue is symbolic of friendship, which the sorority cites as one of its founding values; white symbolizes sincerity and truth, which are two qualities the sorority states it looks for in its members. The official flower is the woodland violet; however, since woodland violets are found in the wild and not available for purchase, people often substitute the African violet. The official jewel and symbol is the diamond, which the sorority uses as a symbol of "the enduring strength and value of friendship". The mascot for Alpha Delta Pi is a lion with the nickname of Alphie. Alpha Delta Pi currently has 161 chapters in the United States and Canada, with the majority concentrated in the southern United States, and over 150 alumnae associations. Its national philanthropy is the Ronald McDonald House Charities.

Elizabeth Moseley Coles, who was elected national president at the first grand convention, was responsible for having Alpha Delta Pi's coat of arms designed. Another sister of Alpha chapter, Agnes Chapman, is given credit for the actual design of the coat of arms. Symbolism from the ritual and the Alpha pin were combined in the coat of arms, and the design originally had a background of violets. In 1919, the convention body voted to make changes and the present design was accepted.

Badges 

 Badge – The first diamond-shaped badge, also known as a lozenge, was first worn by the Adelpheans in 1851. Stars were not included on this first badge, but it did have a monogram of the Wesleyan pin attached to the badge by a link chain, thus forming a guard. In 1854, the stars were added, but it was not until 1874 that the stars and the clasped hands were raised. This design remained with only slight modifications until 1906 when, at Alpha Delta Pi's first convention, Nanaline King presented a new design for the pin. Her design was a smaller gold badge with a black enamel center which pictured the clasped hands, the two stars, and the Greek letters, Alpha Delta Phi. This design was adopted by the convention and is still in use today, with the exception of the Greek letter Phi being changed to Pi at the 1913 convention.
 Alpha Badge – The new member badge, which is a gold pin emblazoned with a lion atop the Greek letters ΒΥΑ, is worn by new members of the sorority prior to their initiation.

Philanthropy
Since 1979, Alpha Delta Pi has been committed to serving Ronald McDonald House Charities (RMHC). Over the course of their partnership, Alpha Delta Pi has contributed more than $16 million to this worthwhile cause. Local RMHC Chapters operate Ronald McDonald House®, Ronald McDonald Care Mobile®, and Ronald McDonald Family Room® programs in local communities.
Today, more than 375 Ronald McDonald Houses in 62 countries help keep families with seriously ill or injured children together when they need it most by offering them a comfortable, temporary residence in close proximity to a medical facility. In addition to donating money. many Alpha Delta Pi collegiate chapters and alumnae associations spend their time and energy volunteering at these Houses.

Membership

The Adelphean
The Adelphean is a quarterly magazine complied with recent events, upcoming activities, outstanding members and chapter news. It is a subscription for members and alumnae and promotes leadership on and off campus. The Adelphean has a partnership with Ronald McDonald House Charities and other local organizations. Its first issue was published March 12, 1907, by a select group of national Alpha Delta Pi leaders and included a collection of letters from outstanding members and updates on the expansion of the secret society. At this time, Alpha Delta Pi was still referred to as "Alpha Delta Phi."

Notable members 
Business, education, and science

Sara Branham Matthews (Alpha) – appointed Senior Bacteriologist for the United States Public Health Service 1931
 Irene Dillard Elliot (Nu) – first Dean of Women at the University of South Carolina; first woman to receive Ph.D. from USC; first woman to hold a full professorship at USC.
 Jessie Gray (Beta Zeta) – Canada's "First Lady of Surgery"
Maureen G. Mulvaney (Epsilon Kappa) – author, psychologist, motivational speaker
 Katherine Van Winkle Palmer (Alpha Theta) – former director of Paleontological Research Institution, first woman to receive a Ph.D. in Paleontology
 Diane Grob Schmidt (Beta Beta) – chemist, former president of American Chemical Society
 Virginia Trotter (Alpha Eta) – first woman to hold highest education position in the US government, former University of Georgia president

Entertainment and arts

Alexis Bellino (Alpha Gamma) – The Real Housewives of Orange County
Kathy Bates (Alpha Zeta) – actress; (Titanic, Fried Green Tomatoes, The Waterboy, Failure to Launch)
Bree Boyce (Zeta Phi) – Miss South Carolina 2011
Maggie Bridges (Zeta Omicron) – Miss Georgia 2014
 Julia Crane (Gamma Tau) – Miss Vermont 2018
Kate Capshaw (Alpha Gamma) – actress; (Indiana Jones and the Temple of Doom) and wife of Steven Spielberg
Deana Carter (Alpha Kappa) – country singer
Carrie Coon (Gamma Theta) – actress; (The Leftovers, Gone Girl, The Post, Avengers: Infinity War, Widows)
Jenna Day (Beta Psi) – Miss Kentucky 2013
Cathy Deupree (Eta) – singer
Monique Evans (Delta) – Miss Texas 2014
Karen Fairchild (Kappa) – country singer; member of Little Big Town
Neva Jane Langley (Gamma Gamma) – Miss America, 1953
Danica McKellar (Alpha Chi) – actress; (The Wonder Years)
Emily Procter (Delta Omicron) – actress; (CSI: Miami, The West Wing)
Ali Rogers (Zeta Nu) – Miss South Carolina 2012–2013, 1st runner-up Miss America 2013
Leigh Sherer (Kappa) – Miss Alabama 1995, top ten Miss America 1996
Jean Smart (Alpha Theta) – actress; (Designing Women, 24, Samantha Who?)
Elle Smith (Beta Psi) – Miss Kentucky USA 2021, Miss USA 2021
Mary Kate Wiles (Alpha Psi) – actress
Kylie Williams (Iota) – Miss Florida 2007; contestant on "Miss America: Reality Check"
Sienna Mascareñas (Eta) – Miss New Mexico 2021; Miss New Mexico's Outstanding Teen 2017

Literature

 Lauren Grandcolas (Delta) – author, passenger on United Airlines Flight 93
 Jessica Nelson North (Theta) – poet and author, editor of Poetry
 Carol Shields (Phi) – author; winner of the Pulitzer Prize for Fiction, 1995

Media

 Ainsley Earhardt (Iota and Beta Epsilon) – journalist and co-host of FOX and Friends
 Nancy Grace (Delta Theta) – CNN News host
 Anna Kooiman (Eta Alpha) – reporter and co-host on FOX & Friends weekend
 Lu Parker (Zeta Sigma) – Miss USA 1994; KTLA news correspondent
 Judy Woodruff (Omicron) – managing editor and anchor of PBS NewsHour

Politics

 Martha B. Alexander (Iota) – former member of the North Carolina General Assembly
 Kimberly Berfield (Zeta Omega) – former member of the Florida House of Representatives
 Robin Carnahan (Gamma Nu) – former Missouri Secretary of State
 Louise Holland Coe (Alpha Nu) – first woman elected to the New Mexico Senate
 Robin Davis (Gamma Kappa) – most senior justice on the Supreme Court of West Virginia
 Harriet Elliott (Phi) – political scientist and delegate
 Karen Hughes (Alpha Zeta) – former Under Secretary of State for Public Diplomacy and Public Affairs
 Maud McLure Kelly (Eta) – lawyer, suffragist, activist; first woman lawyer in Alabama
 Jane Stinchfield Knapp (Alpha Delta) – former member of the Maine House of Representatives
Jane Yelvington McCallum (Delta) – author, Secretary of State of Texas 1926, suffrage activist
 Viola Ross Napier (Adelphean) – first woman elected to the Georgia General Assembly
 Francine Irving Neff (Alpha Nu) – former Treasurer of the United States
Carol Rasco (Delta Delta) – Director of the Domestic Policy Council under President Bill Clinton from 1993 to 1996
 Jean B. Silver (Alpha Theta) – former member of Washington House of Representatives from 1983 to 1997
 Leslie Rutledge (Delta Delta) – Arkansas Attorney General

Sports

 Kelli Finglass (Gamma Chi) – Director of the Dallas Cowboys Cheerleaders
 Sandra Palmer (Gamma Upsilon) – professional golfer
 Summer Rae (Delta Omicron) – former professional wrestler
 Natalie McGiffert (Theta Mu) – 2016 USA Olympian for Rhythmic Gymnastics

Alpha Delta Pi chapters 
Alpha Delta Pi has 161 chapters in the US and Canada.

See also 
List of social fraternities and sororities

References

External links 
 Alpha Delta Pi's Official International Website
 Alpha Delta Pi Memorial Headquarters historical marker

 
Student organizations established in 1851
National Panhellenic Conference
Student societies in the United States
Women's organizations based in the United States
1851 establishments in Georgia (U.S. state)
Organizations based in Atlanta